Dyrøy Bridge is a cantilever bridge in Dyrøy Municipality in Troms og Finnmark county, Norway. The bridge crosses the Dyrøysundet strait connecting the mainland to the island of Dyrøya.  The  bridge opened on 29 August 1994.  The bridge replaced a ferry connection to the island.

See also
List of bridges in Norway
List of bridges in Norway by length
List of bridges
List of bridges by length

References

External links

A picture of Dyrøy Bridge
Another picture of the bridge

Road bridges in Troms og Finnmark
Bridges completed in 1994
1994 establishments in Norway
Dyrøy